The Hunchback of Notre Dame is a British feature length adaptation of the 1831 novel by Victor Hugo, produced for television by the BBC (British Broadcasting Corporation) in 1976 and aired on December 30 the same year. Directed by Alan Cooke and written by Robert Muller, the film stars Kenneth Haigh as Claude Frollo, Warren Clarke as Quasimodo and Michelle Newell as Esmeralda, and features the visual effects by Ian Scoones and the original music by Wilfred Josephs.

Plot summary
On January 6, 1482 — the day of the Feast of Fools in Paris, France, a play written by Pierre Gringoire is being performed at the Palace of Justice. The audience, however, is not very receptive, particularly Jehan, the brother of Notre Dame Cathedral's archdeacon, Claude Frollo. As a diversion, the people decide to elect a Pope of Fools. Quasimodo, the physically deformed bell ringer of Notre Dame, is chosen, despite Frollo's objections. Robin Poussepain calls the remaining attention to a Roma girl named La Esmeralda, who is dancing in the square.

As Gringoire follows Esmeralda, Frollo send Quasimodo to kidnap her for him. Gringoire intervenes, only to be knocked down by the hunchback. Quasimodo is stopped and arrested by Phoebus de Chateaupers, the captain of the French ruler King Louis XI's archers, who enchants Esmeralda, much to Frollo's silent jealousy. Still following Esmeralda, Gringoire is captured by beggars who take him to their king, Clopin Trouillefou, at the Court of Miracles. His life is offered to be spared if someone will marry him, and Esmeralda ends up doing so, though only out of pity.

The next day, in the courtroom of the Palace of Justice, Quasimodo is on trial for crimes of kidnapping and resisting arrest including assault on three of the royal guards. Being a person with deaf ears, Quasimodo did not answer the questions of the deaf auditor, Master Florain, prompting Jehan and Robin to discuss and mock the magistrate. They are also on trial for causing a riot with their fellow students. And when Provost Robert d'Estouteville, asks Quasimodo of his crimes, he instead gave them false answers, angering him as well. Jehan, encouraged by Robin, takes the opportunity to be Quasimodo's lawyer, explaining to the provost how he, as the brother of the archdeacon, is given the benefit of the doubt. Estouteville, before leaving the court, orders Florian to sentence Quasimodo to  one hour of flogging in the pillory to make sure he will respect the law. Gringoire attempts to appeal to Florian, saying that Quasimodo's deafness renders the case unproven. He is instead sentenced to two hours of public torture.

Later that day, Quasimodo is being flogged, Frollo approaches the pillory, but leaves Quasimodo to suffer. Quasimodo, feeling unable to endure his two hours of torture in pillory during the hot weather, begs for water, but is mocked by the people, until Esmeralda gives him some from her canteen. This causes Quasimodo to fall in love with her.

A few months passed, and in Notre Dame, Frollo is practicing alchemy, when Jehan enter, begging for money. He explains to his older brother all about the "squalid melodrama" revolving around Esmeralda. He reveals how Captain Phoebus and Esmeralda will be together that night. Frollo confronts Phoebus, who allows the priest to watch him and Esmeralda have their way with one another. Unaware of Frollo's insane nature, Esmeralda attempts to convince Phoebus that she must remain chaste. While Phoebus is making his move, Frollo bursts out from his hiding place and stabs the captain, leaving Esmeralda alone to be convicted of the crime she didn't commit.

The very next day, at the Palace of Justice, Esmeralda stood before the court, accused of murdering Phoebus with the additional use of witchcraft by the witnesses and Charmalou the prosecutor. Despite her persistent denying, Charmalou successfully forces Esmeralda to confess under torture, and she reluctantly agrees to accept her death sentence by hanging. At night, Frollo visits her while she is imprisoned, and offers her safety in exchange for her becoming submissive to him. She rejects him, knowing the priest is the real attacker of Phoebus.

Esmeralda is being prepared for execution outside Notre Dame. Gringoire, who previously attended Quasimodo and Esmeralda's trials, appeals to Frollo, begging for her innocence but Frollo ignores these claims. Esmeralda sees Phoebus, now fully recovered from his injury, with Fleur de Lys and rejoices. Esmeralda tells Frollo that she should be free, seeing as how she is condemned for a crime never committed. Charmalou callously says that "People have come to see a hanging, not to debate the ethics of our judicial system." and have the hangmen bring Esmeralda to the scaffold. Quasimodo rushes from the cathedral doors, ascends the scaffold and throws one of two executioners into the crowd. He carries Esmeralda into the safety of the cathedral, shouting "Sanctuary," in the process.

Esmeralda later wakes up and finds herself inside Notre Dame. Quasimodo brings her food and finds Djali the goat for her, lamenting how he wishes he were only a beast like her. While Quasimodo explains to Esmeralda that he will jump off the building when she wants him to, Esmeralda spots Phoebus in the square and asks Quasimodo to bring him to her. Quasimodo, although heartbroken, follows her command and leaves to find Phoebus. Unfortunately, Phoebus is still repulsed by Quasimodo's hideous appearance, and he kicks the bell ringer to the ground. When he returns to Esmeralda and tells her of his failure, she is enraged, continuously striking the hunchback, crying her hatred of him. Despite this, Quasimodo merely thanks her and tearfully leaves to resume his job on ringing Notre Dame's bells. Frollo ascends to the tower and attempts to rape Esmeralda. Quasimodo stops him, but upon recognizing Frollo, he begs to be killed. Frollo instead spares Quasimodo, knowing that he is his adopted son. And as he leaves, he angrily promises that no one shall have Esmeralda.

That night, Frollo informs Gringoire that the parliament has voted to remove Esmeralda's right of sanctuary from Notre Dame and have her taken outside to be hanged. After being told of the same news by Gringoire, Clopin leads the beggars from the Court of Miracles to Notre Dame. Not realizing that they have come to rescue Esmeralda, Quasimodo throws timbers and stones, killing most of the vagabonds. It didn't take long before Captain Phoebus and the king's soldiers arrive to eliminate the whole gypsy crowd, along with Jehn and Robin, putting a stop to the rebellion. During the attack on the cathedral, Gringoire and Frollo, with the priest hiding his face in his cloak's hood, bring Esmeralda and Djali out of Notre Dame. Quasimodo, thinking Phoebus and his army have come to the rescue, returns to find Esmeralda gone, to his dismay.

When Esmeralda, Gringoire and Frollo reach the end of their destination on the Seine, Gringoire leaves Esmeralda with Frollo and takes Djali with him, pathetically apologizing for saving himself. Frollo reveals himself to Esmeralda, tells her that the cavaliers have blamed her for causing the rebellion and leading it the carnage, and once more demands to live with him safely as the man who loves her. Esmeralda refuses and tries to get away from the priest, but is trapped when Phoebus and his guards search for Emseralda and meets Frollo, asking him if he had seen her. The priest points at Esmeralda, and Phoebus orders the soldiers to take her back to the scaffold, ignoring her screams for him as he leaves to have his wedding business.

In the morning, Charmalou tells Frollo about the death of so many people. Frollo express his guilt for Jehn, and Charmalou suggested that Quasimodo will be punished for his involvement in the rebellion, with Frollo adding that he, too, must die. The priest then walks up to the cathedral balcony to watch Esmeralda's hanging. After finishing ringing the bells, Quasimodo saw Esmeralda being transported back to the scaffold and brought up there. Gringoire returns to attend her execution, knowing that interfering with it could only worsen things for his dear life even further. On the balcony of Notre Dame, Quasimodo finds Frollo and begs him to stop Esmeralda's execution. Frollo, refusing to interfere again, proclaims that Quasimodo is "beyond salvation" and strikes him down. Esmeralda is hanged, but not before Quasimodo got up and have enough to time to see what is happening. As Frollo evilly smiles at this, the sight of his cruel nature and Esmeralda's death triggers the rage within Quasimodo, and the hunchback throws his own master from Notre Dame to his death, before silently crying over the loss of his only friend.

Gringoire finds Frollo's dead body on the stone steps of Notre Dame, before looking up to the sky and proclaiming that only he would spare to tell a tale, and there is a God in heaven. Phoebus, Fleur de Lys and the entire nobility dance, in honor of their recent marriage.

Cast
 Kenneth Haigh as Claude Frollo
 Warren Clarke as Quasimodo
 Michelle Newell as Esmeralda
 Christopher Gable as Pierre Gringoire
 David Rintoul as Jehan Frollo
 Richard Morant as Phoebus de Chateaupers
 Hetty Baynes as Fleur-de-Lys
 Ruth Goring as Madame de Gondelaurier
 Tony Caunter as Clopin Trouillefou
 Liz Smith as La Falourdel
 John W. Ratcliff as Robin
 Terence Bayler as Cardinal

External links
 

British television films
1976 television films
1976 films
Films based on The Hunchback of Notre-Dame
Films set in Paris
Films set in religious buildings and structures
Films about Romani people